Krasnaya Gorka is a rural locality (a village) in Krasnozilimsky Selsoviet, Arkhangelsky District, Bashkortostan, Russia. The population was 2 as of 2010. There is 1 street.

Geography 
Krasnaya Gorka is located 8 km south of Arkhangelskoye (the district's administrative centre) by road. Pobeda is the nearest rural locality.

References 

Rural localities in Arkhangelsky District